Ingmar Jung (born 4 April 1978) is a German lawyer and politician of the Christian Democratic Union (CDU) who has been serving as a member of the Bundestag from the state of Hesse since 2017.

Early career 
From 2010 until 2017, Jung served as State Secretary at the State Ministry of Science in the government of Minister President Volker Bouffier of Hesse, under the leadership of successive ministers Eva Kühne-Hörmann (2010-2014) and Boris Rhein (2014-2017).

Political career 
Jung became a member of the Bundestag after the 2017 German federal election. In parliament, he is a member of the Committee on Legal Affairs and Consumer Protection and its Subcommittee on European Law.

Other activities 
 Magnus Hirschfeld Foundation, Alternate Member of the Board of Trustees (since 2022)

References

External links 

  
 Bundestag biography 

1978 births
Living people
Members of the Bundestag for Hesse
Members of the Bundestag 2017–2021
Members of the Bundestag for the Christian Democratic Union of Germany
Members of the Bundestag 2021–2025